Vice Admiral Joel Roberts Poinsett Pringle (February 4, 1873 – September 25, 1932) was a senior officer of the United States Navy, serving from 1894 to 1932.

Career
Pringle, born in Georgetown, South Carolina, was appointed to the United States Naval Academy in 1888, and commissioned ensign in 1894.

For his service during World War I, he was awarded the Distinguished Service Medal for exceptionally meritorious service in a duty of great responsibility as commanding officer, Melville and Chief of Staff, Destroyer Flotillas, European Waters.

Pringle graduated from the Naval War College in 1920 and served as a staff member from 1923–1925.  Subsequently, he served as the college's president from 1927–1930.

Attaining the rank of Vice Admiral in 1932, his commands included the destroyer ; ; Flotilla 2, Destroyer Force, Atlantic Fleet; ; the battleship ; President of the Naval War College; Battleship Division 3, Battle Force; and Battleships, Battle Force.

Personal life
On January 25, 1899 he married Cordelia Phythian, daughter of Commodore Robert L. Phythian, USN.

He died at San Diego, California, 25 September 1932.

Awards
Distinguished Service Medal
Spanish Campaign Medal
Victory Medal
Companion of the Order of St. Michael and St. George (United Kingdom)
Officer of the Legion of Honor (France)

Legacy
 The   was named for him. The ship was launched by his widow on May 2, 1942 and commissioned on September 15, 1942.
 Pringle Hall at the Naval War College is named in his honor.

See also

References

Joel R.P. Pringle bio
Pringle Hall, Naval War College.

External links
USS Pringle DD-477
ClanPringle.org.uk

1873 births
1932 deaths
People from Georgetown, South Carolina
United States Navy admirals
United States Naval Academy alumni
United States Navy personnel of World War I
Presidents of the Naval War College
Naval War College alumni
Recipients of the Navy Distinguished Service Medal